Antena 2 is one of the three national radio channels produced by the Portuguese public broadcasting entity Rádio e Televisão de Portugal, the others being Antena 1 and Antena 3.

The channel specializes in the broadcasting of classical and world music as well as other programmes of a cultural nature.

In December 2019, it had a weekly reach share of 1.4%.

See also
List of radio stations in Portugal

References

External links
Official homepage of Antena 2 (in Portuguese)
Antena 2 Live Stream on RTP Play

Radio stations in Portugal
Classical music radio stations
Portuguese-language radio stations
Rádio e Televisão de Portugal